Batwoman is an American superhero television series developed by Caroline Dries based on the DC Comics character Batwoman, a costumed crime-fighter created by Geoff Johns, Grant Morrison, Greg Rucka, Mark Waid, and Keith Giffen. It is set in the Arrowverse, sharing continuity with the other television series of the universe.

The following is a list of characters who have appeared in the television series. Many are named after (or based on) DC Comics characters.

Overview
Legend
 = Main cast (credited)
 = Recurring cast (4+)
 = Guest cast (1-3)

Lead characters

Kate Kane / Batwoman

Kate Kane (portrayed by Ruby Rose; main: season 1 and Wallis Day; recurring: season 2), Gracyn Shinyei as a child) is an out lesbian and the cousin of Bruce Wayne who, armed with a fierce passion for social justice and a flair for speaking her mind, dedicates herself to defending Gotham in Batman's absence as Batwoman.

In season two, the airplane that Kate is coming in from National City crashes. While an ex-con named Ryan Wilder finds the Batsuit, Kate's body is nowhere to be found which affects everyone that knows her in a different way. In a newspaper article talking about Kate's disappearance, Safiyah Sohail sent a message to Alice quoting "Consider us even". When Alice was brought to Coryana, Safiyah denied any knowledge of blowing up Kate's airplane and has proof that she is still alive in the form of Kate's necklace. Upon obtaining Kate's salvaged cellphone, Jacob has the tech guys work to unlock it. By the time Sophie returns, Jacob finds a portrait that has Safiyah's name defacing it and the fact that the portrait was made by Jack Napier. It is then discovered that Kate is still alive and in the sewers where she has a bandaged face. This is because the False Face Society ambushed her on her plane where her face received burns when trying to abduct her and her larynx was damaged enough to alter her voice. Making her loved ones believe she is dead, Black Mask has Enigma work on Kate as Enigma takes her necklace. Enigma makes Kate think she is Roman Sionis' daughter Circe while placing a mask on her burnt face. "Circe" confronts Batwoman and Alice at a boat following Ocean and Angelique's escape and overpowers them, though Batwoman leaves Alice for "Circe". She brings Alice to Black Mask who decides not to kill her. He then orders "Circe" to take Alice downstairs to be tortured. Alice manages to save herself only by offering to craft a new face for "Circe" while noting that she was there when Circe was killed during the Arkham breakout. However, this causes her to realize that "Circe" has the same eyes as her sister as the real Circe had brown eyes.

After telling Jacob about Kate's current state, he and Alice break into the Sionis residence and take “Circe” to the abandoned Crow's headquarters where they confirm she is Kate Kane. Upon obtaining "Circe" and getting DNA printing, Jacob and Alice use some items to cause Kate to remember some things prior to Tatiana and some False Face Society members attacking. Ryan finds her and brings her to Wayne Tower. Mary had to sedate her when Kate experiences a mental battle between her younger self and "Circe". Upon pulling off a trick with Sophie, "Circe" confronts Black Mask where she stabs him in the hand wanting to know why she has Kate's memories. "Circe" fools Luke, Sophie, and Mary by having them think that Kate is in control so that she can access the other parts of the Batcave. After a fight with Ryan, "Circe" makes off with the villain items and gives them to Black Mask while "Circe" rips apart the Batwoman suit. During a showdown at a bridge, Ryan and Alice use the vapors of the Snakebite on "Circe" where she and Alice fall into the river. The vapors and being resuscitated by Ryan purge "Circe" from Kate. After giving Ryan her blessing to continue as Batwoman, Kate leaves Gotham City stating to Sophie that she is going to visit her father and Supergirl before going on a quest to find Bruce.

Ryan Wilder / Batwoman 2.0

Ryan Wilder (portrayed by Javicia Leslie; seasons 2–3; Ava Augustin as a child) is Kate Kane's successor as Batwoman, who was nicknamed "Batwoman 2.0" by Vesper Fairchild. She is a highly skilled yet undisciplined fighter who spent 18 months in prison after two Crows operatives caught her with the drugs that Angelique Martin had in her possession. While her parole officer Susan Stevens expects her to maintain the conditions of her parole, Ryan was living out of her van with her plant and becomes the new Batwoman after finding the Batsuit in the wreckage of an airplane that Kate was coming in from National City. One of her plans to use the Batsuit is to go after Alice who had connections with the squatters that killed her adoptive mom Cora Lewis and the building's landlord. In a scuffle with Tommy Elliot, Ryan gets shot with the Kryptonite meant for Kate. This gives her a wound that is getting worse over time as noted by Mary. Despite Alice burning the Desert Rose crops, it turned out that Julia managed to find a Desert Rose to use on Ryan where it turns out to be Ryan's plant that just bloomed. After being cured and the news about Kate's "death" being confirmed, Ryan starts to work on getting Angelique out of the False Face Society leading to an encounter with Black Mask. Ryan later had a final duel with "Circe" with Alice's help which led to Ryan using the vapors from the Snakebite to purge "Circe" from Kate and even resuscitating her after Alice pulled Kate from the river. Thanks to Susan, the parole board releases Ryan from parole as Ryan receives Kate's blessing to continue as Batwoman. Then Ryan pitches to Luke and Mary to open a community center over Mary's clinic to make it official.

In season three, Ryan is blackmailed by former GCPD detective Renee Montoya to find the missing Batman villain items that fell into the river, while also learning that her birth mother is successful businesswoman Jada Jet, who initially rejects her in favor of her son, Marquis, though Marquis shows an interest in working with Ryan to bring the family closer. As Ryan recovers Batman's trophies, she later discovers that Marquis is suffering from psychopathic tendencies due to brain damage inflicted on him by the Joker as a child with his joy buzzer, shown when he brutally beats and kills an assassin sent to murder Jada. Jada later confides to Ryan that Marquis killed his own father as a joke, which she covered up, and actually had Ryan given away to protect her from Marquis, only learning later that the midwife she had paid to cover it up actually abandoned Ryan beside a shop and kept the two million dollars meant to fund her education for himself. Ryan later finds out that the joy buzzer is the only thing that can restore Marquis's sanity, and that Montoya is actually holding it in her possession in exchange for Ryan freeing Poison Ivy from underneath Gotham, where Batman had previously buried her to stop her from exterminating Gotham's population. As Marquis takes over Wayne Enterprises, Ryan reluctantly helps free Ivy and acquires the joy buzzer, attracting the attention of Alice, who wants to use it to restore her own sanity as well. Ryan manages to defeat Ivy and strip her of her powers with help from Mary and Montoya when she decides to continue her plans to destroy Gotham, and the mayor orders both Montoya and Ivy to leave Gotham forever. As Marquis loses more of his sanity, he eventually plans to unleash bombs of Joker's toxic gas all over Gotham, but he is foiled when Ryan defeats him and uses the joy buzzer on him with help from Alice, who decides to leave Gotham to seek rehabilitation elsewhere. Ryan later starts a relationship with Sophie Moore and mends her relationships with both Jada and Marquis, unaware that the chemicals released from the Joker gas canisters during the blimp crash have created and unleashed a radioactive creature.

Main characters

Beth Kane / Alice

Beth Kane / Alice (portrayed by Rachel Skarsten; seasons 1–3; Ava Sleeth as a child) is Kate's presumed-dead twin sister and the leader of the Wonderland Gang whose personality goes from maniacal to charming and back again as she sets out to erode Gotham's sense of security.

Beth Kane was presumed dead after a car accident, but her body was never recovered. What really happened is that she was rescued from drowning and subsequently being held captive by August Cartwright who wants her to be a companion for his disfigured son Jonathan "Mouse" Cartwright. In addition, Jacob Kane's wife Catherine Hamilton-Kane used DNA analysts and the skull fragments of a deer to make Jacob think that Beth is dead. At a later date, she even received bad treatment from August's mother Mabel who she referred to as the Queen of Hearts. After discovering her mother's decapacitated head in August's freezer Beth would later kill Mabel for taking her mother's earrings, snapping over the years of abuse, imprisonment, and mental torture, starting a house fire leading to her escape and August's disappearance shortly afterwards. At some point after escaping from August, Beth hid on a boat where she was found during a raid by Safiyah Sohail who trained her. Due to Beth falling for Ocean who wanted to make more use of the Desert Rose, Safiyah had their memories of each other suppressed by Enigma. When Beth returned to Gotham and took a sample of the Desert Rose with her, she incurred the wrath of Safiyah.

In season two, Alice starts to check up on Tommy at Wayne Manor while angered about Kate's apparent death in the plane crash. When Jacob visits Wayne Manor due to Tommy as Bruce mentioned that Alice was sighted there, Alice rants about Jacob having to remarry and admits to Jacob that Kate is Batwoman advising him to compare the two facts about them. While walking in the sewers, a newspaper talking about Kate's disappearance lands near Alice with a message from Safiyah Sohail stating, "Consider us even". Alice states to Mouse's corpse that there is a war coming to Gotham City and that Batwoman won't be around to stop it. Tying a rat to Mouse's corpse, Alice attracts a lot of bats to feed off it which causes them to carry a poison when attacking a Batwoman rally. When Sophie finds where Alice is hiding, both of them are taken captive by Tatiana. When brought to Coryana where Alice confronts her, Safiyah denies any knowledge of blowing up the airplane that Kate was in while also having proof that she's still alive by showing her necklace. Before returning Alice to Gotham, Safiyah wants her to do an unspecified assignment. This was to target Ocean. When they reunite, Alice and Ocean start to experience suppressed memories of their time on Coryana. After fighting off the assassins sent by Safiyah, Alice and Ocean drive off. When Alice brings a white tube from the back seat to her, Ocean asks if she has ever heard of Jack Napier. Alice uses a look-alike of Ocean to fool Tatiana that she killed him. Due to Ryan exposing the truth, Safiyah had the real Ocean brought to her and ordered Alice to use the knife on him. Alice reluctantly does so. When she found that Safiyah lied to her, Alice is removed from Safiyah's lair where she kills the men assigned to that job and later burns the Desert Rose crops. After a talk with a hallucination of a younger Kate, Alice plans to find a way to forget her and tries to with help from Enigma until Ocean crashes it. Enigma gets away by saying "Mockingbird Anew" which restores their memories. When Ocean gets abducted by the False Face Society, Alice works with Batwoman to rescue him and Angelique after torturing one of the members. Once that was done, Alice and Batwoman are attacked by a brainwash Kate Kane who believes she is Circe Sionis. Both of them are overpowered as Batwoman leaves Alice for her. "Circe" brings Alice to Black Mask who notes her history of leading the now-defunct Wonderland Gang and decides not to kill. He instead instructs "Circe" to take Alice down to the basement. "Circe" tortured Alice about the information revolving around who the new Batwoman is. She told Alice she would reveal it if Black Mask was present. When that was done, Alice does reveal to Black Mask her knowledge that he is Roman Sionis and that she knew Circe before she was killed in the Arkham breakout. Alice offered to make "Circe" a new face which Black Mask complied to. When Black Mask when to get a cosmetic, Alice tried the face on "Circe" where she notes that the real Circe had brown eyes and this "Circe" had blue eyes. When the face was on "Circe", Alice finds out that "Circe" is actually Kate. After Black Mask dismissed Alice while advising her to keep quiet about what happened here or else, Alice went back to Enigma's office and suspended her from the ceiling in order to get answers on how to break Kate's brainwashing. Enigma told her to get something that belonged to Kate. When Alice gets the keys to Kate's motorcycle, Enigma told her that it requires a password to fully undo the brainwashing as Enigma's neck is snapped by Ocean much to Alice's dismay where Ocean states that Kate will only put Alice back in Arkham Asylum. After Ocean disposed of Enigma's body, Alice confronts Jacob in his car stating that she found Kate alive. They managed to cause some of Kate's memories to return before being attacked by Tatiana and some False Face Society members. When in Safiyah's clutches, Alice sees the news detailing Jacob's arrest and the confirmation that Beth Kane is Alice. Batwoman was able to secure Alice's release by giving her plant to Safiyah. However, Alice later finds Ocean dead after killing Tatiana outside her hideout. Following a visit from Mary, Alice has Ocean's body cremated and dumped into the ocean as Safiyah appears to pay some respect to Ocean's death. After Safiyah mentions how Black Mask will have procured Poison Ivy's plant through Circe and how she will grant Alice a sanctuary on Coryana, Alice stabs Safiyah with the same knife used on Ocean stating that she will remove it when she regains what she lost. During a showdown with Black Mask where he mentioned that he's a good villain, Alice states that Joker is worse than him, uses one of Joker's acid flower spray on his face, and slams the mask on Roman's face. Then she catches up to Ryan where she helps to use the Snakebite vapor on "Circe" prior to Alice falling into the river with her. She gets Kate out of the river and helps Ryan resuscitate her before being taken away by the approaching police officers. When visited by Ryan in Arkham Asylum, Alice rants about Black Mask being her noisy neighbor and reveals to Ryan that her biological mother is still alive.

 Skarsten also portrayed an alternate version of Beth who was displaced from her native Earth during "Crisis on Infinite Earths" and appeared on Earth-Prime. This version was saved by Kate and did not get lost during the car accident. She is later sniped by August Cartwright, mistaking her for Alice.

Sophie Moore

Sophie Moore (portrayed by Meagan Tandy; seasons 1–3) is a military academy graduate turned high-level Crows agent and Kate's estranged ex-girlfriend. When they were both threatened expulsion, Sophie decided to sign an agreement denying her sexuality, fearing rejection from everyone including her mother and led to her and Kate's break-up, since Kate wasn't afraid of judgment of being herself. In her earlier life with the Crows, Sophie was the one who apprehended Cluemaster thanks to an anonymous tip from Stephanie Brown. As season one progresses, Sophie starts to be honest with herself, those closest to her and her sexuality and eventually figures out that Kate is Batwoman.

In season two, Sophie starts to work with the second Batwoman when it came to the False Face Society. She figures out that Ryan was Batwoman and notes this during the mission to find Cluemaster. After resigning due to Russell Tavaroff's insubordination, Sophie informs Jacob to review the evidence of him shooting Luke. After Jacob Kane shuts down Crows Security, Sophie commends him on this action. When Black Mask instigates a riot, Sophie stayed by a wounded Mayor Michael Akins until the paramedics arrived. Following the defeat of Black Mask and the removal of "Circe" from Kate's body, Sophie has one final moment with Kate before she leaves Gotham to visit her father, visit Supergirl, and search for Bruce.

Mary Hamilton / Poison Mary

Mary Elizabeth Hamilton (portrayed by Nicole Kang; seasons 1–3) is Kate's stepsister and a medical student/influencer-in-the-making loosely based on Bette Kane. She makes it her mission to provide aid to those living in Gotham's under-served communities.

In season two, Mary's clinic was shut down by Jacob following the incident with Amygdala. Though Mary will not allow this to happen and finds a way to keep it opened. Jacob allows it to remain open after she treated his Snakebite drug and he helps to tend to those who have been given zombie personalities by the latest Snakebite drug. Upon the revelation that Black Mask had Enigma brainwash Kate into being Circe Sionis, Mary did use a sedative on her as she notes that Kate and "Circe" are fighting for control of Kate's body. Following Jacob's arrest, Mary gets a call from him stating that he is being transferred to a prison in Metropolis and to avoid getting targeted by the False Face Society. Her clinic comes in handy during the riots instigated by Black Mask and she figured out that the Snakebite found on Russell Tavaroff's body can be converted into a vapor to free Kate from the "Circe" personality.

In season three, Mary gets ensnared by Poison Ivy's vine. She starts to place plants in her clinic with one of them helping in the thawing of Jordan Moore. It is then revealed that Mary was infected by the plant that caused her to be corrupted and become a new Poison Ivy that's referred to as Poison Mary when exposed to sunlight, where she attacked Chris Hayner and trapped Virgil Getty. Under this control, Mary was able to steal the Batwing component that contained the Lucius Fox A.I. to make use of it during the confrontation at the botanical gardens. After getting away, Mary drives off with Alice to another location, the pair becoming lovers. After Batwoman's attempt to cure her, Mary changes her appearance where she sports a copy of Poison Ivy's outfit. Alice has called this form "Poison Mary". When Poison Mary infiltrated Marquis Jet's party, she revealed some secrets about Batwoman which led to him taking a disguised Luke captive. During a confrontation on the roof, Poison Mary escapes when Marquis was hit by the desiccation formula that was supposed to be used on Poison Mary. After mind-controlling Alice to sleep, Poison Mary makes her way to where Poison Ivy is. They then end up in an embrace that brings Poison Ivy back to full power. When at Gotham Dam, Poison Ivy drains Poison Mary completely when trying to destroy the dam, returning her to normal.

Luke Fox / Batwing

Lucius "Luke" Fox, Jr. (portrayed by Camrus Johnson; seasons 1–3) is a staunch Dark Knight loyalist and the son of Lucius Fox who keeps Wayne Tower secure in Batman's absence but understands that Gotham needs a new hero.

In season two, Luke helps out Ryan Wilder when she becomes the current Batwoman following Kate's disappearance. When Luke was shot by Russell Tavaroff and Wolf Spider secretly administers the Desert Rose serum, Luke ends up in a purgatory state where he sees his father looking out the window as a subconscious form of Bruce Wayne advises him to either live or die. Regardless, Luke awakens from his coma. When Tavaroff made bail, Luke encountered him at a bar where he partook in a poker game that John Diggle was involved him. Afterwards, Tavaroff tried to attack him outside the bar only for Diggle to fight him off. Then Luke and Diggle compared how they lost their fathers as Diggle advises him to take the right path as the Bat-Signal gives off a Morse code. Luke later takes on the Batwing mantle where he saves Mary from a powered Russell Tavaroff.

In season three, Luke works to improve the Batwing costume where he meets the A.I. version of his father within it. When Mary becomes Poison Mary, she steals the Lucius Fox A.I. from the Batwing suit and gives it to Marquis. Luke managed to reclaim the A.I. when he and Sophie infiltrate Wayne Enterprises. When it comes to stopping a Batblimp that is going to detonate enough to dump Joker acid on Gotham City, Batwing manages to divert it to a desolate part of Gotham City at the sacrifice of the Lucius Fox A.I.

 Camrus Johnson also portrays his Earth-99 counterpart during "Crisis on Infinite Earths".

Catherine Hamilton-Kane

Catherine Hamilton-Kane (portrayed by Elizabeth Anweis; season 1) is Mary's mom, Kate's stepmother, Jacob's second wife and one of Gotham's most powerful citizens who made her fortune as a defense contractor and the CEO of Hamilton Dynamics. After marrying Jacob, Catherine faked Beth's  death by bribing DNA analysts in an attempt to help him and Kate move on, leading to everyone giving up the search and leaving Beth at the mercy of August. When realizing that Beth might be Alice, Catherine desperately tried to hide the truth by making several attempts on Alice's life. As revenge for the pain Catherine caused her, Alice manipulated events that caused her to reveal to her deception of Beth's death to Jacob, resulting in a file for divorce and confess her corrupt ways upon the Wonderland Gang's infiltration of an event, where Catherine starts to collapse from the poison that was placed in her drink. As she was dying, Alice provided a cure only after Catherine apologized for the years of suffering, she unintentionally put her through. But when its revealed Mary was also poisoned, Catherine sacrifices her life to allow Mary to live. Before passing away, Catherine states that she knew of Mary's clinic and is proud of her. At the time when the complications of both versions of Beth Kane being on Earth-Prime start to worsen, Alice hallucinates seeing Catherine's ghost.

Season two revealed some of Catherine's other experiments like working to cure Aaron Helzinger to research on the Desert Rose which also earned Catherine the hatred of Safiyah Sohail and the dismay of Jacob.

Jacob Kane

Jacob Kane (portrayed by Dougray Scott; seasons 1–2) is Kate and Beth's father, Bruce Wayne's uncle, and a former military colonel with a chip on his shoulder who commands a private security agency, the Crows, in an attempt to protect Gotham better than Batman could. Following Alice causing a mass breakout at Arkham Asylum, Jacob told Batwoman that there will be war if she pops up again while comparing Batwoman and Alice to Batman and Joker.

In season two, Jacob becomes affected by Kate's apparent death in a plane crash. He finds Tommy in the form of Bruce who claims that he's helping to find Kate while mentioning that Alice was sighted at Wayne Manor. When Jacob goes there and finds Alice, she mentions that Kate is Batwoman and that he should compare the facts about them. Jacob later removes the "do not cross" tape around the Bat-Signal and shines it in sadness. After having the tech guys unlock Kate's salvaged cellphone upon Sophie's return, Jacob sees the picture of a portrait with Safiyah's name defacing it. Jacob then notices that the portrait is by Jack Napier. This leads to him trying to obtain the portrait when it turns out that it can lead him to Coryana. When he does claim it after his vehicle strikes Wolf Spider, it was later mentioned by Sophie that the portrait was a fake much to the dismay of the Crows. Jacob even learned about some other dark secrets about Catherine like the experiments to cure Aaron Helzinger to research on the Desert Rose much to his dismay. Jacob later gets hooked on Snakebite due to the orchestrated plots of Black Mask which enables Jacob to relive his past like hallucinating that he rescued Beth. In his latest hallucination, Jacob passed out and was brought to Mary's clinic after being found by two homeless people. Mary treated him and learned how Jacob came in contact with the Snakebite drug. He does help Mary treat those who were starting to develop zombie-like personalities from the new Snakebite drug. After a talk with Sophie Moore regarding Luke Fox getting shot, Jacob advises Russell Tavaroff to hand in his gear and go on suspension until further notice. Tavaroff then knocks out Jacob and plans to dispose of him with the Snakebite drug. Jacob is saved by Batwoman who defeats Tavaroff and those involved. After being advised to "burn it down", Jacob exposes the truth about what happened the night when Luke Fox was shot and states that Crows Security is shutting down. Sophie commends him on this action. While in the parking lot, Jacob is confronted by Alice who states that Kate is alive. They managed to cause Kate to remember some memories before getting attacked by Tatiana and the False Face Society. Jacob is brought to Roman Sionis where Jacob acknowledged learning that Roman and Black Mask are one and the same. As three of the False Face Society members are actually police officers who are secretly on Sionis' side, Sionis advised Jacob to keep quiet or else his remaining family will be eliminated. Jacob is arrested by those police officers for withholding information about Alice being Beth Kane. News of Jacob's arrest reached every news outlet. On TV while being taken into GCPD HQ, Jacob stated that Beth became Alice due to the bad people twisting her childhood and for all parents to think about their children. Thanks to a deal, Jacob informs Mary that he is being transferred to a prison in Metropolis and advises her to stay off the False Face Society's radar. After Black Mask is defeated, Kate plans to visit her father before going to visit Supergirl and search for Bruce.

Mar Novu / Monitor

Mar Novu / Monitor (portrayed by LaMonica Garrett; season 1) is a multiversal being who tests different Earths in the multiverse in preparation for an impending "crisis" orchestrated by Mobius / Anti-Monitor, his polar opposite who is dedicated to ending the multiverse. Garrett is credited only for "Crisis on Infinite Earths: Part Two".

Renee Montoya

Renee Montoya (portrayed by Victoria Cartagena; season 3) is a former member of the Gotham City Police Department who left due to the corruption in some of its members. In her earlier life, Renee had a history with Pamela Isley prior to being experimented on by Mark LeGrand. To stop Poison Ivy, Renee had to enlist Batman to create a desiccation formula that would disable Poison Ivy. It worked as Renee had Batman hide Poison Ivy's body.

She is first seen when investigating the actions committed by the second Mad Hatter. Renee later talks to Mayor Hartley stating that the Mad Hatter is not the one that fought Batman and to hear her out before Gotham City becomes "Jim Gordon's version" again. She later meets Batwoman and voices her knowledge of her being Ryan Wilder due to a deal that Alice cut with her. Batwoman had to comply with Renee's offer that involved Alice being a work release consultant in the stolen Batman trophies - a mission she knew they could never complete because she herself had the last one (Joker's buzzer). Her real goal was for Batwoman and Alice, in the process of tracking down the trophies, to eventually discover where Batman buried Pamela Isley, so that she could free the love of her life. While helping to examine a whip to make sure it's not Catwoman's whip, Alice learned that Renee had a large classified file on Poison Ivy and her being experimented on by Mark LeGrand by subjecting her to oleander, nightshade, and water hemlock. Poison Ivy's activities led to Renee advising Batman to bury her alive. After being displeased at Batwoman and Batwing for withholding the information that one of Poison Ivy's plants infected Mary, Renee speaks with Sophie at the bar as they make out in Renee's apartment. When it came to the desiccation formula to use on Poison Mary, Renee accompanied Batwoman and Sophie into the Batcave while learning that Batman is Bruce Wayne. When tipped off by Alice, Sophie later found that Renee had found Joker's joy buzzer first as Renee makes off with Poison Ivy's body. After getting Poison Ivy's body to a national park where she is still weakened, Renee tries to get through to Poison Ivy to no avail even when Poison Mary shows up.

Cartagena reprises her role from the first season of Gotham.

Jada Jet

Jada Jet (portrayed by Robin Givens; season 3) is the CEO of Jeturian Industries which specializes in microtechnology, Marquis Jet's mother, and Ryan Wilder's birth mother. She took over control over the death of her husband a decade ago because of one of Marquis' sociopathic behavior and doubled the company's wealth over time. While learning the truth about Ryan, Jada starts to get displeased with Ryan associating herself with Marquis until Ryan learned the truth about what happened during his childhood following the attack by Professor Pyg. Jada has been working on ways to cure her son of this sociopathic personality. At the time when Marquis sent Victor Zsasz to take out Jada, she figures out that Ryan is Batwoman when she uses some fighting skills to defeat him. Her connection with the Black Glove Society was officially known to Ryan when Marquis abducted her and four other members. Ryan was able to save Jada. She later helps Ryan in a plot to thwart Marquis. After Marquis was hit with the joy buzzer, Jada was pleased to see Marquis reverted to normal.

Marquis Jet / Joker II

Marquis Jet (portrayed by Nick Creegan as an adult; season 3; Kendrick Jackson as a 7-year-old, Christian Darrel Scott as a 13-year-old and 16-year-old) is the playboy son of Jada Jet and Franklin, the half-brother of Ryan, and the executive vice-president of Jeturian Industries. As a child, he was attacked by the original Joker who hijacked his school bus and zapped his head with his electric joy buzzer, causing serious brain damage. Ever since then, Marquis has exhibited anger issues and sociopathic behavior such as using a magnifying glass to burn ants to deliberately triggering his father's peanut allergy for a laugh. While not wanting Ryan to associate herself with Marquis, Jada commissioned the recreation of the freeze serum with help from Virgil Getty in an attempt to put him on ice until a treatment could be found. After murdering Professor Pyg, Marquis gives into his urges as the new Joker, seizing control of Wayne Enterprises, dyeing his hair purple, and putting on an orange suit. When he encounters Poison Mary at a party, Marquis learns some secrets about Batwoman that leads to him capturing a disguised Luke. During the rooftop confrontation, Marquis was hit by the desiccation formula that was supposed to be used on Poison Mary, Batwoman and Luke took Marquis' body to Mary's clinic as Batwoman calls Jada to work on another way to cure Marquis. Unfortunately, the water caused by the partial destruction of the dam revives Marquis. He proceeds to work on improve Arkham Asylum that even included a work release program that he started by sending Victor Zsasz to take out his mother. In addition, he even allied with Joker's toymaker minion Kiki Roulette to claim Joker's joy buzzer. When Alice caught up with Kiki, Marquis shot Kiki and offered Alice a partnership. When Marquis had captured Jada and four other members of the Black Glove, he declared both of them fated due to the mutual effect of Joker's bus hijacking that ran Gabi's car off the bridge. After killing three of the Black Glove members, Marquis is attacked by Batwoman before he can finish off Jada. Mary later found out from Alice that she told Marquis about the Batcave. Using Joker acid and the stolen Batblimp, Marquis planned to detonate the Batblimp in order to dump Joker acid on Gotham City. When it comes close to the deadline of the explosion, Batwoman fought Marquis where they fell from the Batblimp. As Batwing works to divert the blimp to a desolate part of Gotham City, Batwoman receives help from Alice in fighting him where the joy buzzer was used on Marquis' head. He wakes up normal much to the joy of Ryan and Jada.

Recurring characters
This is a list of recurring actors and the characters they portrayed in multiple episodes, which were significant roles. The characters are listed by the order in which they first appeared.

Introduced in season one

Tyler
Tyler (portrayed by Greyston Holt) is a Crows agent and Sophie's ex-husband.

Chuck Dodgson
Chuck Dodgson (portrayed by Brendon Zub) is a former Crows agent who serves as Alice's second-in-command of the Wonderland Gang and lover.

Vesper Fairchild

Vesper Fairchild (voiced by Rachel Maddow) is a snarky gossip maven and media personality who comments about the different activities in Gotham City.

In season two, Vesper talks about the new Batwoman as she debuts her new Batsuit when defeating Victor Zsasz.

Tommy Elliot / Hush / "Bruce Wayne"

Tommy Elliot (portrayed by Gabriel Mann as Tommy and Hush, Warren Christie when posing as Bruce Wayne) is a real estate mogul and former childhood friend of Bruce Wayne, who later becomes the villain Hush.

In season two, Tommy masquerades as Bruce and works to get the Kryptonite and the Batsuit. When he engages Ryan Wilder as Batwoman, she manages to defeat Tommy despite him firing the Kryptonite into her shoulder. Mary later mentions that Tommy has been taken back to Arkham Asylum.

Reagan
Reagan (portrayed by Brianne Howey) is a bartender and one of Kate's love interests, as well as Magpie's sister and former accomplice.

Dana Dewitt
Dana Dewitt (portrayed by Allison Riley) is an anchorwoman for Gotham City News who reports on the events happening in Gotham City.

In the season three finale following the Batblimp's explosion dumping the Joker acid on a desolate part of Gotham City, she broadcasts a warning to the citizens to stay away from the area. Just then, Dana and her news crew are attacked by a mangled figure with exposed bones.

Julia Pennyworth

Julia Pennyworth (portrayed by Christina Wolfe, whose casting has been criticized as whitewashing due to Julia being black in the original Batman comic books) is a British spy, daughter of Alfred Pennyworth, and Kate's ex-lover. She pursued the Rifle and discovered that he works for Safiyah Sohail.

In season two, Julia assists in the search for Kate who was apparently killed in a plane crash. Following an encounter with Tommy Elliot in the form of Bruce Wayne, Julia brings this up with Luke showing the prints of Tommy from "Bruce" while mentioning that he doesn't even know that her father is living in a loft in London. She later encountered Alice who mentions the threat of their mutual enemy Safiyah. Following some undercover work, Julia saved Luke and Mary from Dire-Flail where she claimed that Kate is dead upon some body parts washing up in Bludhaven. She somehow was able to procure a Desert Rose that was needed to deal with Ryan's Kryptonite wound where it turned out to be Ryan's plant. When calling someone about the information about Kate, Julia is told that they talked before causing Julia to wonder what happened that day. Alice later enlisted her to help find Enigma. When Julia does confront Enigma, she gets tranquilized by the chemical in Enigma's staff. After recovering, Sophie is informed by Julia that she is taking a transfer to Berlin.

Jonathan Cartwright / Mouse
Jonathan Cartwright / Mouse (portrayed by Sam Littlefield as an adult, Nicholas Holmes as a child) is the disfigured son of August Cartwright and Alice's right hand member of the Wonderland Gang with a talent for voice mimicry and impersonation who considers himself Alice's brother figure and best friend. He lets his father keep Beth captive so he could have a friend who won't shun him for his deformity, letting Alice get abused resulting in her becoming Alice. When Mouse starts to see that Alice is becoming too obsessed with wanting to kill Batwoman following the translation of Lucius Fox's coded journal, Alice puts Mouse out of his misery by poisoning his tea.

In season two, Alice still has Mouse's corpse as she mentions her upcoming war with Safiyah Sohail after she put a message on the newspaper talking about Kate Kane's disappearance. Tying a rat to Mouse's corpse, Alice attracts a lot of bats to feed off it making them carriers of the same poison. What's left of Mouse's corpse was delivered to Mary to foreshadow what Alice has planned with the bats.

In season three, Mouse appears as a hallucination of Alice alongside Ocean.

August Cartwright
August Cartwright (portrayed by John Emmet Tracy) is Mouse's father who fished Beth out of the river following the accident and imprisoned her to be Jonnathan's "friend" and for his own nefarious purposes. In the present, August has been posing as Doctor Ethan Campbell (portrayed by Sebastian Roché) who is a well-known plastic surgeon and philanthropist. Using the face of Duela Dent, Alice captures August and leaves him for Kate and Jacob to be their prisoner. Kate accidentally kills August in anger for what he did to Beth and their mother's corpse.

Whelan
Whelan (portrayed by Sean Kuling) is a former agent of Crows Security.

Miguel Robles
Miguel Robles (portrayed by Nathan Witte) is a Crows agent working for Tommy Elliot who was tasked with getting Lucius Fox's journals, only to accidentally get him killed and frame someone else for it. Years later, he took up the Detonator identity to cover his tracks only to be thwarted by Batwoman and Luke.

M. Butler
M. Butler (portrayed by Alex Zahara) is a therapist at Arkham Asylum. Mouse later killed and impersonated him.

Introduced in season two

Susan Stevens
Susan Stevens (portrayed by Rebecca Davis) is a parole officer assigned to Ryan Wilder. After Black Mask enlisted the police officers on his side to set up Ryan for possession of Snakebite, Susan confronts Ryan who claims that she is Batwoman and Black Mask wants her dead. Susan gets her proof when the police officers on Black Mask's side try to do away with her and Ryan defeats them. Susan then gives Ryan her visitor badge so that she can sneak out of the courthouse. Following Black Mask's defeat, Susan is present when the parole board releases Ryan from her parole.

Tatiana / The Whisper
Tatiana / The Whisper (portrayed by Leah Gibson) is a skilled assassin and henchwoman working for Safiyah whom she has a crush on and is loosely based on Tahani. When Beth Kane was first brought to Safiyah, Tatiana was weary of her. When she found Beth and Ocean interacting while planning to make further use of the Desert Rose, Tatiana informed Safiyah who had their memories of each other suppressed by Enigma. After Alice caused a bat swarm so that Mary can make use of the Desert Rose, Tatiana was dispatched to Gotham City. She catches up with Alice at the time when Sophie Moore was planning to arrest her and knocks them both out. While Safiyah talks with Alice, Tatiana kept an eye on Whisper. After Safiyah was done with Alice, Tatiana returned them to Gotham City. Safiyah dispatched Tatiana to Gotham City again to make sure that Alice killed Ocean. She was fooled and had to fill in some blanks about Beth's history with Ocean. After Alice's fight with Ryan, Tatiana took her to meet with Safiyah. Thanks to Ryan, Safiyah found out that the body was a fake and had the real Ocean found. Alice was instructed to use the same knife on Ocean as Tatiana watched. Shortly thereafter Tatiana informed Ryan of the truth, that Safiyah didn't have Kate. After Alice was removed from the palace and the knife that was coated in the Desert Rose was removed from Ocean, Safiyah revealed to Tatiana that she found out that Tatiana was the one who killed Alice's gang and slipped the note to Alice that pinned Kate's apparent death on Safiyah. When Tatiana defended her actions by admitting her love for Safiyah and that Alice was becoming an obstacle to Safiyah, Safiyah stabbed Tatiana using the same knife used on Ocean. Safiyah stated to Ocean that she'd remove the knife from Tatiana's body when she decided to forgive her. This later happens when she and Safiyah come to Gotham City to meet with Black Mask. Tatiana started targeting everyone that was involved with the witness protection program. She even led some False Face Society members into abducting Alice and Jacob Kane. Alice later fought Tatiana outside her hideout and managed to kill her prior to finding Ocean dead.

Safiyah Sohail

Safiyah Sohail (portrayed by Shivani Ghai) is the compassionate and charismatic ruler of a small community on the island of Coryana who is the Rifle's boss and the boss of the Many Arms of Death. She also has a history with Alice and they both share a mutual hatred of Catherine Hamilton-Kane as well as a connection with Black Mask. She was the one who found Beth sometime after she escaped from August Cartwright. Due to her brother-figure Ocean wanting to make more use of the Desert Rose and Beth falling for him, Safiyah punished them by having her hypnotist Enigma suppress their memories of each other. Suspecting that Safiyah caused the airplane crash that supposedly killed Kate, Alice manipulates events that involve poison-carrying bats and the serum derived from the Desert Rose to attracted Safiyah's attention. This caused Safiyah to send Tatiana to pick her up. During a meeting with Alice, Safiyah denied any knowledge of causing the airplane crash and has Kate's necklace as proof that she is still alive. Though she wants Alice to do some unspecified job upon her return to Gotham City. This turns out to be looking for a man named Ocean. When Alice had what appeared to be Ocean's body delivered to Coryana, Ryan exposed the fake causing Safiyah to have her men look for Ocean. When Ocean was found, Safiyah had Alice use the same knife on Ocean which she reluctantly did. After Alice is removed from her home upon revealing that she doesn't have Kate, Safiyah removed the knife from Ocean where it turned out that the knife was coated in the Desert Rose. Safiyah also found out that Tatiana was the one who left the note from Safiyah toward Alice and uses the same knife on her vowing to Ocean that she'll remove it from Titania when she forgives her. In retaliation for the trickery, Alice sets fire to the Desert Rose crops which infuriates Safiyah. She later sends Ocean to find a Desert Rose that might be in Batwoman's possession. Safiyah removed the knife from Tatiana as they go to Gotham City to meet with Black Mask. During the discussion, Safiyah revealed that she was the one who leaked to him Kate Kane's flight plan despite not meeting Kate, how Enigma brainwashed Kate into being Circe Sionis, and also told him that Alice is Beth Kane. Both of them sent Tatiana and some False Face Society members to abduct Alice and Jacob Kane. With Alice in her clutches, Safiyah ranted to her about 7 villagers dying in the fire she started as Alice countered about Safiyah lying to her about having Kate. To free Alice, Batwoman gave up the Desert Rose in her possession to Safiyah. After "Circe" stabbed Black Mask in the hand while stating that she has Kate's memories, Safiyah advises Black Mask to tell "Circe" or she'll do it for him. Following Ocean's death, Safiyah meets Alice at the shore where she is spreading Ocean's ashes. While mentioning to Alice that Black Mask is having Circe procure a sample of Poison Ivy's plant from the Batcave to restore the Desert Rose crops, Safiyah states that she can offer sanctuary to Alice on Coryana. Alice then stabs Safiyah with the same knife that was used on Ocean vowing to remove from Safiyah when she has regained the things that she lost. Alice reveals that, after stabbing Safiyah, she took her body to a junkyard, tossed it in a random junked car, and then had the entire thing crushed, just to make sure Safiyah couldn't be revived.

Angelique Martin
Angelique Martin (portrayed by Bevin Bru as an adult, Kerensa Cooper as a child) is a former foster acquaintance of Ryan Wilder and used a tactic to rescue her from Candice Long. Growing up, they fell in love until it got strained with Angelique taking up a life of crime. At one point, she ran into Sophie and Alice at the time when they were looking for Ocean. Following the arrest of Candice Long, Ryan called Angelique to notify her and call a truce. After Angelique finds out that Sophie Moore had manipulated Ryan into bugging her phone, their relationship is strained again. As Batwoman, Ryan gets the information from Angelique on where Ocean can be found. Angelique wore a baby doll mask when two False Face Society members killed Commissioner Forbes. Ryan found out through Jordan Moore's description and had to persuade Angelique to leave that life. Though Black Mask would not take this departure lightly and had her tied up on a sawmill. Ryan rescues Angelique with Sophie's help. She takes the blame for Commissioner Forbes’ murder to protect Ryan from attacks by the False-Face Society. It was also revealed that Angelique helped Ocean to make the Snakebite drug. While in Edgewater Correctional, Ryan persuades her to leak the names of the culprits that shot Forbes. While having Sophie arrange for Angelique to be placed in witness protection, Ryan gets a call for her which is interrupted when the transport gets intercepted by members of the False Face Society who kill the Crows Agents present and make off with Angelique. With Angelique in his possession, Black Mask orders his men to gather ingredients for Snakebite while also using a corrosive agent to threaten Angelique. Following Black Mask's fight with Batwoman and Sophie Moore, Angelique states to Black Mask that she can help find Ocean to complete the Snakebite recipe. Batwoman and Alice succeed in rescuing Angelique and Ocean. Afterwards, Angelique successfully enters the witness protection program.

Ocean
Ocean (portrayed by Nathan Owens) is a zen gardener and thinker with a complicated past with him being a brother-figure to Safiyah Sohail. His past involved a previous connection to Safiyah as she wants Alice to go after him. One point in his past is that he wanted to make use of the Desert Rose and Beth Kane fell for him. Safiyah found out through Tatiana and had them punished by having Enigma suppress their memories of each other. When Alice and Ocean reunite, suppressed memories start to surface of their time on Coryana. After fighting off the assassins sent by Safiyah, Alice and Ocean drive off. When Alice brings forward a white tube that was in the back seat, Ocean asks her if she has ever heard of Jack Napier. While in an abandoned subway tunnel, Ocean and Alice have more suppressed memories and end up surrendering the map to Sophie once Ocean burned off the blood. Alice then kills an Ocean look-alike to make it look like that Alice did her job as the two of them wait for Tatiana to show up. Tatiana was fooled by the look-alike and Ocean left Gotham City. After Ryan exposed the trickery, Safiyah's men found the real Ocean in Italy and had him brought to Coryana, Alice reluctantly used the same knife on him. Once Alice was removed from Safiyah's home after revealing that she doesn't have Kate, Safiyah removed the knife from Ocean where it turned out that it was coated in the Desert Rose. After using the same knife on Tatiana for tricking Alice with the note that pinned the blame of Kate's death on her, Safiyah told Ocean that she will remove the knife from Tatiana when she forgives her. It was also revealed that Ocean helped to make the Snakebite drug for the False Face Society with Angelique's help. Ocean was later dispatched to Gotham City to find the Desert Rose that might be in Batwoman's custody. His detour brings him to Enigma's office where Alice is. Enigma evades them by quoting "Mockingbird Anew" which restores their memories. Due to the Snakebite recipe being incomplete, Angelique states to Black Mask that she can help him find Ocean. The False Face Society track down Ocean and make off with him while tasering Alice. As Ocean and Angelique slowly work on the Snakebite drug, Batwoman works with Alice to rescue them with Ocean getting non-fatally shot in the process. After recovering, Ocean was present when Alice talked to Enigma about undoing the brainwashing she did to Kate. When Enigma stated that it required a password to fully undo the brainwashing alongside an item that belonged to Kate, Ocean snapped Enigma's neck much to the dismay of Alice as he stated that Kate will only put her back in Arkham Asylum if it worked. He later disposes of Enigma's body. After helping to procure items for Alice and Jacob Kane to restore Kate's memories, Alice later found Ocean dead in her hideout after slaying Tatiana. Following a visit from Mary, Alice had Ocean cremated and spreads his ashes into the ocean. After falling off the bridge with Kate, Alice had a near-death experience involving Ocean.

In season three, Ocean appears as a hallucination of Alice alongside Mouse.

Roman Sionis / Black Mask

Roman Sionis (portrayed by Peter Outerbridge) is the CEO of Janus Cosmetics who wears a wooden black-colored mask when operating as the crime lord Black Mask. In this alias, he leads the False Face Society where he only forgives someone after he kills them for their failure and dislikes any type of desertion in the group. According to him, Roman had a daughter named Circe who was captured by the Crows and was said to have been killed by Batwoman the day when Alice caused a mass-breakout at Arkham Asylum where Circe was incarcerated. While arranging for Kate Kane's capture and faking her death, Black Mask arranged for the False Face Society to distribute the Snakebite drug. After Black Mask had Forbes killed for speaking out about the Snakebite distribution, Roman gave his sympathies for the death on TV. Finding out that his operative Angelique was planning to leave the group, Black Mask had her abducted, tied to a chair, and facing the body of one of the plague doctor mask-wearing operative who failed him. When Batwoman tracks down Angelique, she ends up captured and watches the Guy Fawkes mask-wearing operative cut in half with a circular saw for also failing him. After mentioning some of his backstory, Black Mask starts to have Batwoman cut in half only for Sophie Moore to show up. Upon Sophie freeing Batwoman and Angelique, Black Mask got away. The next day, Black Mask had Enigma work on Kate. After sending one of his men to chloroform and drug Jacob with the Snakebite drug, Black Mask kills the members who murdered Forbes to tie up loose ends. One member states that the Snakebite drug production is stalled due to Angelique's arrest and Ocean going missing. As Roman, Black Mask visits Jacob leaving him the Snakebite drug claiming that someone placed it in Janus Cosmetics. Upon somehow hearing of Angelique's release, Black Mask sent some of his men to intercept the witness protection transport and reclaim Angelique. Afterwards, he plans to have Snakebite recreated with her help and starts enlisting drivers to help obtain the ingredients. When it came to the Fear Toxin, Black Mask ambushed Sophie Moore only for Batwoman to intervene and throw a Batarang into him. Both of them had to let Black Mask go due to him showing theatrical live footage of Angelique at the gunpoint of one of the False Face Society members. Upon hearing from Angelique that the Snakebite recipe is incomplete, Black Mask is told by her that she can help him find Ocean. Once that was done, Black Mask was present when Enigma finishes brainwashing Kate to be Circe Sionis. When "Circe" brings Alice to him after she helped Batwoman disrupt the Snakebite drug making and freeing Angelique and Ocean, Black Mask states that he knows about Alice and her now-defunct Wonderland Gang. While deciding not to kill Alice, Black Mask orders "Circe" to take Alice downstairs. After "Circe" tortured Alice, Black Mask was called down when Alice stated that she can tell him who the new Batwoman is. Once Black Mask was present, Alice noted that she knew Circe before her untimely death, her knowledge of Black Mask being Roman Sionis, and that she can make a new face for "Circe". Black Mask complied to allowing a new face to be made for "Circe" and even had to obtain a cosmetic to help out. After the work is done, Black Mask has Alice removed from the property while being advised to remain quiet on what transpired. Black Mask later met with where Safiyah revealed that she was the one who leaked to him Kate Kane's flight plan despite not meeting Kate, how Enigma brainwashed Kate into being Circe Sionis, and also told him that Alice is Beth Kane. Both of them sent Tatiana and some False Face Society members to abduct Alice and Jacob Kane. With Jacob in Roman's clutches, Jacob noted that he figured out that he was Black Mask. Due to three of the False Face Society members being the police officers that are secretly on Black Mask's side, Roman advises Jacob to be quiet about this information or else he will have his remaining family members exterminated. "Circe" returns to Black Mask where she mentions having Kate Kane's memories. After "Circe" stabbed Black Mask in the hand and demanding answers on those facts, Safiyah advises Black Mask to tell "Circe" or she'll do it for him. After "Circe" gets Kate's journal, Black Mask arranges for the police officers on his side to set up Ryan for possession of Snakebite and Roman briefly confronts her in a police car. While planning to have Ryan eliminated, Black Mask meets with former Crows operatives and persuades them to side with him. When Russell Tavaroff states to Black Mask that he would just be a "cog" in someone's device, Black Mask plans to make him a "machine" instead. Following the successful mission of "Circe", Black Mask starts to make use of the villain items that she stole from the Batcave. Instigating a riot on TV, Black Mask experimented on Russell Tavaroff using Bane's Venom and the Snakebite drug which didn't work at first. Alice later fought Black Mask while Ryan went after "Circe". When Black Mask states that he'll be a great villain, Alice comments that Joker was far worse, uses Joker's acid flower spray on Roman's face, and slams his mask on his face which permanently welds. Vesper Fairchild later reported that Black Mask and Alice were remanded to Arkham Asylum. Ryan briefly saw him stating the words "Janus" over and over.

Evelyn Rhyme / Enigma

Enigma (portrayed by Laura Mennell) is a hypnotist who is a mutual ally of Safiyah Sohail and Black Mask where she also poses as a therapist named Dr. Evelyn Rhyme. She was first mentioned in a flashback where Safiyah had Enigma erase some of Beth Kane's memories as well as create her "Alice" persona. Enigma is first seen when Black Mask has Enigma work on an injured Kate Kane. While asking Black Mask to let her work in private, Enigma starts to work on Kate while taking her necklace. Alice roped Julia Pennyworth into helping to find Enigma so that she can make Alice forget the pain of the one who caused Kate's death. When Julia found her, Enigma knocked her out with a chemical from her cane. Enigma finds Alice in her office and does a session with her when she wants Enigma to get rid of her memories of Kate Kane. During this trance Enigma puts her through, Alice keeps seeing visions of a young Kate Kane and Ocean. The real Ocean crashes the session and engages Alice until Enigma quotes "Mockingbird Anew" which restores their memories while allowing Enigma to get away. Enigma finishes up on Kate and hypnotizes her into being Circe Sionis. Alice later visited Enigma again and suspended her from the ceiling when she asks her how to undo the brainwashing she did to Kate. Enigma states that she will need a personal item of Kate. After getting the keys to Kate's motorcycle, Enigma states that a password needs to fully undo the brainwashing as the motorcycle keys would be needed to trigger a memory. When Alice starts to ask for the password, Enigma's neck is snapped by Ocean much to the dismay of Alice as Ocean stated that Kate would put her back in Arkham Asylum. Ocean later disposes of Enigma's body and suggests to Alice that Enigma was the daughter of the Riddler; due to her having a cane that is similar to his.

Russell Tavaroff

Russell Tavaroff (portrayed by Jesse Hutch) is a Crows agent who Jacob Kane assigned to take over Sophie Moore's case. While examining the scene of the fight with Black Mask, Russell found some of Batwoman's spilled blood. He tries to find a match in the system only for Sophie to remove Ryan's info from their system. After using lethal force on the Snakebite users and the shooting of Luke Fox, Russell and his followers doctor the footage claiming that Luke had a gun. Upon finding out after a talk with Sophie Moore, Jacob advises that Russell go on suspension pending an investigation only to be knocked out by Russell. Then he and his followers try to have an unconscious Jacob undergo another Snakebite injection only to be defeated by Batwoman. Jacob later exposes the truth on what happened Luke Fox while also mentioning the arrests of Russell and those involved. Russell was later released on bail while awaiting trial. Luke later encountered Russell in a bar and got involved in a poker game that John Diggle was involved in and beats Russell in the game. When Russell attacks Luke outside the bar, he is fended off by Diggle. Russell is among the former Crows operatives that side with Black Mask. When Russell states that he would just be a "cog" in someone's device, Black Mask offers to make him a "machine" instead. Using Bane's Venom and the Snakebite drug, Black Mask experimented on Russell which didn't work at first. He came to in Mary's clinic and pursued her for the Snakebite that was taken off him before being defeated by Batwing.

Introduced in season three

Lucius Fox A.I.

The Lucius Fox A.I. (voiced by Donny Lucas) is an A.I. version of Lucius Fox that Luke finds in the Batwing helmet.

Guest stars
The following is a supplementary list of guest stars, some recurring, who appear in lesser roles. The characters are listed in the order in which they first appeared.

Introduced in season one
 Kate's trainer (portrayed by Gray Horse Rider) - An unnamed Indian man who trained Kate in the arctic.
 Michael Akins (portrayed by Chris Shields) - The mayor of Gotham City. In season two during the riots instigated by Black Mask, Mayor Akins was wounded in his van and Sophie stays by his side until the paramedics arrive.
 Gabrielle "Gabi" Kane (portrayed by Michelle Morgan) - The wife of Jacob Kane and mother of Kate and Beth who perished in a car accident that Batman tried to prevent.
 Margaret "Margot" / Magpie (portrayed by Rachel Matthews) - Reagan's sister who operates as a jewel thief named Magpie.
 Shane McKillen (portrayed by Giles Panton) - A man who works for Catherine. After losing a pinkie to Alice after a failed mission with his fellow men, he carries Alice's message to Catherine and leaves her stating that she is on her own.
 Bertrand Eldon / Executioner (portrayed by Jim Pirri) - A former executioner at Blackgate Penitentiary who starts going after the same group of people he blames for sending innocents to death row. He is killed by Jacob which set off a gas-based fail-safe that nearly killed Batwoman and Jacob. The Executioner is loosely based on the minor Batman villain of the same name.
 Angus Stanton (portrayed by Mark Gibbon) - The assistant district attorney who is one of the Executioner's victims.
 Dean Deveraux (portrayed by Matthew Graham) - A worker at Hamilton Dynamics that Mouse impersonates. He is later killed by Mouse when he gets frustrated at Alice for keeping Batowman's identity secret.
 Chris "The Fist" Medlock (portrayed by Kheon Clarke) - A boxer and ex-con previously prosecuted by Stanton who was suspected of being Executioner.
 Stu Donnelly (portrayed by Phillip Mitchell) - A GCPD detective who is one of the Executioner's victims.
 Judge Raymond Calverick (portrayed by Brent Fidler) - A corrupt hanging judge who worked with Angus and Stu to send innocent men to Blackgate Penitentiary's death row.
 Dean Devereaux (portrayed by Matthew Graham) - The head of Hamilton Dynamic's project that involved building the Coil Accelerator. Alice had him kidnapped so that Mouse can impersonate him. After finding out about the Coil Accelerator, Mouse confronted Alice about it while shooting Dean.
 The Rifle (portrayed by Garfield Wilson) - A professional assassin who works for Safiyah Sohail.
 Jack Forbes (portrayed by Cameron McDonald) - The police commissioner of the GCPD. In season two, Forbes speaks out about the distribution of the Snakebite drug and is assassinated by the False Face Society. This was witnessed by Jordan Moore.
 Oliver Queen / Green Arrow (portrayed by Stephen Amell) - An archery-based superhero who protects Star City.
 Nash Wells / Pariah (portrayed by Tom Cavanagh) - An alternate version of Harrison Wells who was tricked into freeing the Anti-Monitor.
 Bruce Wayne of Earth-99 (portrayed by Kevin Conroy) - An older parallel universe counterpart of Bruce Wayne from the future of Earth-99, who's confined to an exo-skeleton after killing his world's Superman. He lost all hope sometime during his career and started killing his enemies, which was made worse when his Kate died trying to show him the error of his ways. Bruce was accidentally electrocuted during a scuffle with Kate of Earth-1 and Kara.
 Clark Kent of Earth-167 (portrayed by Tom Welling) - A version of Clark Kent from Earth-167 who gave up his powers to spend time with Lois and his family. When Lex Luthor of Earth-38 came to kill him, the former chose not to once he learned what happened; feeling it wasn't worth it.
 Lois Lane of Earth 167 (portrayed by Erica Durance) - The wife of Earth-167's Clark Kent.
 Clark Kent / Superman (portrayed by Tyler Hoechlin) - A Kryptonian superhero who defends Metropolis on Earth-38.
 Lois Lane (portrayed by Elizabeth Tulloch) - The wife of Earth-38 Clark Kent.
 Iris West-Allen (portrayed by Candice Patton) - The wife of the Flash.
 Clark Kent / Superman of Earth-96 (portrayed by Brandon Routh) - A version of Clark Kent from List of DC Multiverse worlds#Arrowverse who became the editor-in-chief of the Daily Planet after losing his Lois and fellow staff members in a gas attack caused by an unsatisfied Gotham City inhabitant.
 Ray Palmer / Atom (portrayed by Brandon Routh) - A Legends member, scientist, and inventor capable of shrinking and growing to immense sizes whilst wearing a special suit.
 Kara Danvers / Supergirl (portrayed by Melissa Benoist) - A Kryptonian operating on Earth-38 and the cousin of Superman.
 Barry Allen / Flash (portrayed by Grant Gustin) - A speedster who protects Central City.
 Lex Luthor (portrayed by Jon Cryer) - The archenemy of his Earth's Superman and Supergirl.
 Sara Lance / White Canary (portrayed by Caity Lotz) - The leader of the Legends.
 Mick Rory / Heat Wave of Earth-74 (portrayed by Dominic Purcell) - An alternate version of Legends member Heat Wave from Earth-74 who lent his Waverider to the assembled heroes.
 "Leonard" (voiced by Wentworth Miller) - The A.I. of Earth-74's Waverider who is modeled after Captain Cold.
 Mia Smoak (portrayed by Katherine McNamara) - The daughter of Green Arrow who was brought from the year 2040 by the Monitor.
 Lyla Michaels / Harbinger (portrayed by Audrey Marie Anderson) - An A.R.G.U.S. agent who was granted multiversal powers by the Monitor so she could help avert Crisis.
 John Constantine (portrayed by Matt Ryan) - An enigmatic and irreverent former con man turned reluctant supernatural detective and Legends member.
 Jonah Hex of Earth-18 (portrayed by Johnathon Schaech) - A version of Jonah Hex who hoarded a Lazarus Pit.
 Parker Torres (portrayed by Malia Pyles) - A lesbian student at Gotham Prep and adept hacker. After an ex-girlfriend of hers outed her, she staged a train brake failure while she was a passenger to garner sympathy from her homophobic parents. Later, she anonymously extorted all of Gotham under the threat of doxxing in order to gain money to leave the city and start a new life. After her life was threatened by Alice, Parker secretly sent a text to everyone that Alice and a bomb were at Gotham Prep under the cover that she'd leak Batwoman's identity. With the lives saved and Alice in Crows custody, Kate made Parker a deal to do community service and return any extortion money instead of going to juvenile detention, while supporting her out lifestyle. After being saved from an attempted abduction from Hush, Parker helps Batwoman in finding Luke and Julia when they get captured by Hush.
 Slam Bradley (portrayed by Kurt Szarka) - A member of the Gotham City Police Department. After he saved Batwoman from being hit by a loose grappling hook, the media and many Gotham citizens began "shipping" them, to Kate's chagrin.
 Reggie Harris (portrayed by Seth Whittaker) - An inmate at Blackgate Penitentiary that Jacob encounters. He was incarcerated when he was framed for the murder of Lucius Fox by Miguel Robles. After being released for a re-trial, Reggie is confronted by Luke where Reggis is sniped by Michael Fisher on Miguel's orders.
 Bryan Akins (portrayed by Ryan Rosery) - The son of Mayor Michael Akins.
 Steven Forbes (portrayed by Gage Marsh) - The son of Commissioner Jack Forbes.
 Natalia Knight / Nocturna (portrayed by Kayla Ewell) - A woman with porphyria who adopts a vampire persona and targets people for their blood while using ketamine in fanged dental implants to stun them.
 Duela Dent (portrayed by Alessandra Torresani) - The niece of Harvey Dent who slashed her own face when she was young and targeted social media influencers. After being apprehended, Alice stole her face so she could use it to get revenge on August.
 Diane Moore (portrayed by Jeryl Prescott) - The mother of Sophie who likes Batman and dislikes Batwoman.
 Mabel Cartwright (portrayed by Debra Mooney) - The mother of August and the grandmother of Mouse who Alice referred to as the Queen of Hearts. She was the first person Alice ever killed.
 Michael Fisher (portrayed by Sean Kohnke) - An assassin working for Miguel Robles who was responsible for killing Alia Nazari and Reggie Harris. He tried to take out Jacob Kane and was killed by him.
 Johnny Sabatino (portrayed by Carmine Giovinazzo) - A gangster with connections to Tommy Elliot.
 Professor John Carr (portrayed by Linden Banks) - A numerical analyst with a pacemaker in his heart who was among the linguists that were abducted by Hush as part of Alice's plot to get Lucius Fox's coded journal translated. Alice subjects him to lethal shock therapy when he fails to translate it in time.
 Tony Kim (portrayed by Tom Lim) - A NSA analyst who was among the linguists that were abducted by Hush as part of Alice's plot to get Lucius Fox's coded journal translated. Alice subjects him to lethal shock therapy when he failes to translate it in time.
 Tim "Titan" Teslow (portrayed by Terrence Terrell) - A former football player who went rogue upon taking steroids and was remanded to Arkham Asylum after killing a referee who called out Tim's penalty. Thanks to Alice's prison break, Tim was among the Arkham Asylum inmates that escaped. Upon his escape, he wielded two machetes and started to tie up some loose ends by beheading the lead medical examiner who covered up his medical condition and stabbed his brother Apollo for testifying against him despite Batwoman's attempt to intervene. Mary had to talk Jacob into holding a truce with Batwoman to defeat Tim. When it came to Tim's latest target Coach Kurt Donahue, Batwoman fought and managed to get through to him. Though Jacob went back on the truce and had his Crows agents gun him down.
 Bruce Wayne / Batman (portrayed by Warren Christie) - The cousin of Kate who went missing three years ago. Thanks to Alice, Tommy Elliot started to impersonate him. In season two, Luke was shot by Russell Tavaroff and encounters a subconscious version of Bruce who gives him the choice of either living or dying.

Introduced in season two
 Cora Lewis (portrayed by Shakura S'Aida) - The adoptive mother of Ryan Wilder who alongside her landlord was killed by squatters that were associated with Alice. This incident earned Alice the ire of Ryan. Cora later appears in Ryan's hallucinations during her fight with Alice advising her not to avenge her.
 False Face Society - A gang of masked people who work for Black Mask. They are instructed to distribute the Snakebite drug, dispose of anyone that is a threat to them, and dispose of any witnesses in the act. Each of them is named after the mask they wear in the credits.
 Clown (portrayed by Jason Day) - A clown mask-wearing member of the False Face Society that Ryan Wilder had an encounter with during her first outing as Batwoman.
 Ski Mask (portrayed by Marcus Aurelio) - A ski mask-wearing member of the False Face Society that Ryan Wilder had an encounter with During her first outing as Batwoman.
 Devil (portrayed by Alex Stines) - A devil mask-wearing member of the False Face Society that Batwoman tries to stop from distributing the Snakebite drug.
 Rudy / Panda (portrayed by Aason Nadjiwon) - A member of the False Face Society that wears a giant panda mask. Jacob Kane met with him about a vehicle that went past the loading area for the airplane that Kate was on at the time when Rudy passed himself off as a tipster. Then Rudy had Kevin tase him. For Kevin's initiation into the False Face Society, he had to shoot Jacob. Rudy and those present were taken down by Batwoman who then talks Kevin down.
 Hockey Mask (portrayed by Tommy Europe) - A hockey mask-wearing member of the False Face Society who partook in the assassination of Commissioner Forbes. Black Mask later killed him to tie up loose ends and left his body in the shooting range he worked at.
 Gas Mask (portrayed by Matt Reimer) - A gas mask-wearing member of the False Face Society who partook in the assassination of Commissioner Forbes. Black Mask later killed him to tie up loose ends and left his body in the shooting range he worked at.
 Plague Doctor (portrayed by Chad Bellamy) - A plague doctor mask-wearing member of the False Face Society who partook in targeting Jordan Moore. They found her with Sophie in the parking lot of Crows Security HQ and were fended off by Batwoman. Black Mask killed him and had his body hung in front of a bound Angelique Martin to serve as a warning to anyone who plans to desert the False Face Society.
 Guy Fawkes (portrayed by Nathaniel Shuker) - A Guy Fawkes mask-wearing member of the False Face Society who partook in targeting Jordan Moore. They found her with Sophie in the parking lot of Crows Security HQ and were fended off by Batwoman. When Batwoman got captured trying to rescue Angelique at the sawmill, Black Mask had this operative executed by circular saw in front of her for failing him.
 Chrome Mask (portrayed by Rochelle Okoye) - A chrome mask-wearing member of the False Face Society. She was the one who infected Jacob Kane with the Snakebite drug and later assisted in intercepting Angelique's witness protection transport.
 X'ed-Out Eyes (portrayed by Sonya Proehl) - A member of the False Face Society that wears a mask that has the eyes x'ed out. She was the one who told Black Mask about the stalling of the Snakebite drug due to Angelique being incarcerated at Edgewater Correctional and Ocean going missing.
 Porcelain Mask (portrayed by Sean Owen Roberts) - A porcelain mask-wearing member of the False Face Society that took part in obtaining the ingredients of the Snakebite drug.
 Patchwork (portrayed by Christian Sloan) - A patchwork mask-wearing member of the False Face Society.
 Teardrop (portrayed by Cooper Bibaud) - A member of the False Face Society.
 Ogre Mask (portrayed by Tyson Arner) - A member of the False Face Society that wears an ogre mask. He was present when he gave people the Snakebite drug that started to give its users zombie-like personalities.
 Victor Zsasz (portrayed by Alex Morf) - A charismatic, skilled hitman with high, unpredictable energy who proudly carves tally marks onto his skin for every victim he kills. When later hired by Safiyah Sohail to target Mary, Victor is defeated by Ryan in her new Batwoman suit. In season three, Victor Zsasz is recruited into Marquis Jet's Arkham Asylum work release program and sent to take out Jada Jet. He remembers Ryan from the last time that he encountered her. With a distraction from Jada, Ryan defeated Victor Zsasz and is taken back to Arkham Asylum.
 Candice "Candy Lady" Long (portrayed by Linda Kash) - A woman who lures children to her van and takes them captive where she holds them in her attic. Using a jar that she slowly removes jelly beans from, she counts down the days for someone to look for the child. Anyone that doesn't show up has Candice performing a child trafficking activity where she gives them to the False Face Society. This nearly happened to a younger Ryan until Angelique rescued her. Years later, Candice is still up to her activities. Running into Ryan again when she was looking for Kevin Johnson, Ryan learned her connection with the False Face Society and beat her to submission. Vesper Fairchild later mentioned that Candice was arrested and revealed her connections to the False Face Society.
 Kevin Johnson (portrayed by Eli Tsepsio Lamour) - A young boy in foster care who gets abducted by Candice and sold to the False Face Society. His initiation was to shoot a captive Jacob Kane. With Batwoman's help after she took down the False Face Society members present, Jacob was able to talk Kevin down.
 Garrett Hang (portrayed by Donny Lucas) - A man that Jacob Kane was meeting about the sale of the portrait that Jack Napier made. During the discussion, he was killed by Pike.
 Many Arms of Death - An assassin organization operating in Coryana that is loyal to Safiyah Sohail.
 Pike (portrayed by Scott Pocha) - A pike-wielding assassin and member of the Many Arms of Death. After killing Garrett Hang during his meeting with Jacob Kane, Pike was taken prisoner by Batwoman. Due to a deal, Batwoman allowed Jacob Kane and Sophie Moore to see Pike. Before committing suicide by cyanide capsure, Pike revealed that the portrait contained the map to Coryana.
 Rapier (portrayed by Alex Stines) - A rapier-wielding member of the Many Arms of Death who accompanied some unnamed members in attacking Ocean at the motel he was at. He was killed by Alice.
 Dire-Flail (portrayed by Janene Carleton) - A flail-wielding member of the Many Arms of Death who was dispatched by Safiyah to target Luke and Mary. Both of them held their own against Dire-Flail before she was killed by Julia Pennyworth.
 Evan Blake / Wolf Spider (portrayed by Lincoln Clauss) - An old friend of Kate Kane who operates as an art thief. During the heist of the portrait made by Jack Napier, Wolf Spider is accidentally struck by the Crow vehicle pursuing him. As the Crows claimed the portrait, Ryan discovered that Evan is Wolf Spider and gave him to Mary to patch up. Mary later revealed to Evan that the portrait he was trying to steal was a fake. Wolf Spider was later enlisted by Mary to infiltrate Luke's hospital room and administer the Desert Rose serum.
 Dr. Ethan Rogers (portrayed by Milo Shandel) - A doctor at Hamilton Dynamic's branch Garnick Industries who is seeking to replicate the Desert Rose cure. He does that by releasing Aaron Helzinger to get to the source of it. After Batwoman defeats Helzinger, a masked Dr. Rogers shows up with his men and coerces Batwoman into giving her the map by threatening to shoot Sophie Moore. Batwoman had no choice but to comply. When the Crows trace Dr. Rogers to Garnick Industries, Jacob and Sophie find Dr. Rogers and those with him dead as they were massacred by the Many Arms of Death.
 Aaron Helzinger / Amygdala (portrayed by R. J. Fetherstonhaugh) - A mentally-unstable patient of Hamilton Dymanics that was released by Dr. Ethan Rogers to get to the mystery behind the Desert Rose. He does that by ramming a truck into the van carrying Jacob Kane and Mary Hamilton where he holds them captive at Mary's clinic. Mary admits some things in front of Jacob like her back-alley work and the Desert Rose coming from Coryana. When Sophie Moore brings Amygdala the map to Coryana which she obtained from Alice and Ocean, he knocks her out as Batwoman arrives. With help from Luke, Batwoman defeats Amygdala.
 Jordan Moore (portrayed by Keeya King) - An activist against bad law enforcement and the younger sister of Sophie who was a witness to Commissioner Forbes' murder. In season three, Jordan was captured by Black Glove and used in their cryogenic experiments. Her life was saved by Batwoman and Mary.
 Horten Spence (portrayed by Jaime M. Callica) - A reporter from the Gotham Gazette who lost his job and attended the opening of a community center that Ryan was going to help out in. He found information on the related community center attacks when visited by Batwoman and was attacked by Kilovolt. Mary was able to heal him. After the Kilovolt plots were thwarted, Horten regained his job with the article that exposed it. Vesper Fairchild called him Batwoman's version of Lois Lane.
 Imani (portrayed by Samantha Liana Cole) - The Director of Tutoring at Sheldon Park Community Center.
 Ellis O'Brien (portrayed by Derek Morrison) - The CEO of Edgewater Correctional who was behind the Kilovolt plots on community centers as he believed those places would prevent the rise in criminals. Using special electrical guns, Ellis had different prisoners briefly released to attack locations. Batwoman confronted Ellis and was attacked by him and his minions. They were all defeated by Luke who used the electrical gun he got off of one of Ellis' pawns. Vesper Fairchild reported that Ellis and those involved are now part of the prison population.
 Michael Kastrinos (portrayed by Sean Kohnke) - An inmate at Edgewater Correctional who was used by Ellis O'Brien in his Kilovolt plot. In his masked appearance, he wielded an electrical gun when attacking a community center that Ryan was going to help out in. Then he tried to do away with Horten Spence. Luke was able to learn of Michael's identity and later found that security footage of him in his prison cell was looped to cover up his use in Ellis' illegal activities.
 Arthur Brown / Cluemaster (portrayed by Rick Miller) - A villain, fired game show host, and father of Stephanie Brown who leaves clues at his crimes. In her earlier days, Sophie Moore apprehended Cluemaster thanks to an anonymous tip from Stephanie which led to him getting incarcerated at Blackgate Penitentiary.
 Stephanie Brown (portrayed by Morgan Kohan) - The daughter of Cluemaster who disapproves of her father's activities.
 Eli (portrayed by Kaiden Berge) - A petty criminal that Ryan, Luke, and Sophie encounter in their cell. When trying to commit a carjacking, Luke tried to stop him only for Eli to lie to Russell Tavaroff that he was committing the crime where Luke was shot when he was trying to prove it on his phone. Batwoman later confronted him after he stole a car and he stated that Tavaroff shot Luke. Batwoman left Eli for the police.
 Lucius Fox (portrayed by Domonique Adam) - The father of Luke Fox who wrote the journals in codes about how to defeat the Batsuit. He was killed by Miguel Robles who sought the journals. When Luke was shot by Russell Tavaroff and ended up in a purgatory state, Lucius was partially seen by the window in a pondering state as a subconscious manifestation of Bruce Wayne gave Luke the choice of living or dying. Later, among Lucius' things, Luke finds the Batwing suit that his father designed for him as well as an A.I. copy of him.
 John Diggle (portrayed by David Ramsay) - An A.R.G.U.S. agent from Star City who is on assignment in Gotham City. Luke Fox encountered him in a bar where he got involved in a poker game with Russell Tavaroff. When Russell attacked Luke outside the bar, Diggle fended him off. While comparing to how they both lost their fathers, Diggle advised Luke to take the right path as they notice the Bat-Signal giving off a morse code. In season three, Diggle assists his old friend Jada Jet into finding Joker's joy buzzer that would be used to help treat Marquis.

Introduced in season three
 Liam Crandle / Mad Hatter II (portrayed by Amitai Marmorstein) - An obsessed fan of Alice who becomes the second Mad Hatter after purchasing the hat from two boys who found it on the shores of the river. Mad Hatter hijacks Mary Hamilton's medical school graduation to protest Alice's fate and the inequity of Gotham's healthcare system. When Alice finally meets him, Mad Hatter was persuaded to release everyone from the hat's mind-control before being non-fatally stabbed by her.
 Mayor Hartley (portrayed by Sharon Taylor) - The Mayor of Gotham City who succeeds Michael Akins.
 Steven / Killer Croc 2.0 (performed by Heidi Ben) - A teenager who got mutated into the second Killer Croc upon coming in contact with Killer Croc's tooth that cut him. After his mutation, he started paralyzing and feeding off his captives before being subdued by Batwoman. Vesper Fairchild stated that Steven has been remanded to a special habitat at Arkham Asylum where she referred to him by the name of "Killer Croc 2.0".
 Mason (portrayed by Alistair Abell) - The father of Steven who is looking for him ever since his mutation into the second Killer Croc. As he didn't want Batwoman or Alice to harm and lock up his son, Mason attacked them before being dragged off by Steven. He was later found dead by Batwoman.
 Whitney Hutchison (portrayed by Nevis Unipan) - A young girl who was abducted by Killer Croc 2.0 by the river. When she had a broken leg in the sewer due to Killer Croc 2.0's attack, Whitney was nearly eaten by Killer Croc 2.0 before being saved by Batwoman. While being loaded into the ambulance, Whitney was reunited with her mother.
 Nora Fries (portrayed by Jennifer Higgin) - The wife of Mr. Freeze who was released from cryogenic stasis after a cure for her disease was found and ended up in Arkham Asylum due to her disoriented mental state. After escaping three years later, Nora's age started to catch up to her and is now an old woman. She no longer wants her loved ones to sacrifice their lives to save hers and is content with living out her final years in peace with her sister.
 Dee Smitty (portrayed by June B. Wilde) - A processing desk worker at the GCPD who is Nora's sister. When Nora was released from stasis and given a cure for her disease, and started to have her age catch up to her after escaping Arkham, Dora worked to take care of Nora. She studied Mr. Freeze's notes and stole her brother-in-law's serum from the GCPD in an attempt to prolong her sister's life again, which led them to be targeted by mercenaries until Batwoman saved them.
 Charlie Clark (portrayed by Tom Lenk) - The head of Wayne Enterprise's public relations department since Lucius Fox was still alive.
 Black Glove - A crime syndicate operating in Gotham City that was founded by Marla Elliot and consisting of elite families with goals to "fix" their troubled children and dispose of any witnesses to their activities. Jada Jet is associated with this group.
 Virgil Getty (portrayed by Josh Blacker) - An operative of Black Glove who has been conducting experiments with the freeze serum so that Jada Jet can preserve Marquis until a cure for his mental condition can be found. A Poison Ivy-controlled Mary later found Virgil and buried him up to his neck in soil by the time Batwoman and Alice find him. While chained up in the sewer near Wayne Enterprise, Virgil is visited by Sophie upon being told by Alice. Using a blowtorch for torture, Sophie learns from him that Tommy Elliot's mother was involved with Black Glove. While Sophie argues with Batwoman, Virgil strangles himself to death on the chains suspending on him.
 Barbara Kean (portrayed by Sara J. Southey) - The ex-wife of Jim Gordon, owner of an art gallery, and member of the Black Glove. Barbara used special medicines on her son James Gordon Jr. to cure him of his psychosis but this placed her son in a vegetative state at Arkham Asylum. Marquis later abducted her and the other Black Glove members and he subjected her to the same medicines through a special gas mask. Batwoman saved her and arranged for Barbara to get medical attention.
 Burton Crowne (portrayed by Eric Ruggieri) - Member of the Black Glove. He and the other Black Glove members were abducted by Marquis where he bludgeoned Crowne to death with a baseball bat.
 Jeremiah Arkham (portrayed by Glen Ferguson) - Member of the Black Glove. He and the other members were abducted by Marquis where he killed Arkham offscreen.
 Mario Falcone (portrayed by Marcio Barauna) - Member of the Black Glove. He and the other members were abducted by Marquis where he killed Falcone offscreen.
 Lazlo Valentin / Professor Pyg (portrayed by Rob Nagle) - A former criminal who later became Jada Jet's chef in her office's dining hall. After being fired and losing his family, Lazlo became Professor Pyg again and planned revenge on Jada. He fought Ryan and Sophie before being killed by Marquis.
 Franklin (portrayed by Kevin Mundy) - The former CEO of Jeturian Industries, husband of Jada and father of Marquis. He dies when Marquis sets off his peanut butter allergy by putting peanut butter on his hamburger during a family camping trip, with Franklin not having his epipen on him.
 Zoey (portrayed by Victoria Dunsmore) - The girlfriend of Marquis. During dinner with Jada and Marquis, Zoey is killed by Professor Pyg.
 Damien (portrayed by Guy Fauchon) - The butler of the Jet family.
 Chris Hayner (portrayed by Josh Collins) - A man who a Poison Ivy-controlled Mary entombed in a honeycomb with honeybees on it. While in Mary's clinic, he recognized her as the culprit when the bandages were removed from his eyes.
 Pamela Isley / Poison Ivy (portrayed by Bridget Regan) - A former botany student of Gotham University, who was a passionate, brilliant scientist with a mind for changing the world for the better. Pamela's plans shifted when she was experimented on by a colleague named Mark LeGrand who injected her with various plant toxins which turned her into the infamous Batman villain Poison Ivy. With a formidable power coursing through her veins, Pamela used her powers to do what she thought was right ... even if Batman and those closest to her disagreed with her dangerous methods. With a desiccation formula made by Batman, Renee disabled her. Poison Ivy's body was hidden by Batman in the Batcave away from sunlight and water. After one of Poison Ivy's plants that was stolen by "Circe Sionis" got out and took control of Mary, Renee had to work with Batwoman and Sophie to get a sample of the desiccation formula in order to use on Poison Mary. While Batwoman and Sophie tried to use the serum on Poison Mary, Renee made off with Poison Ivy's body in order to save her from herself. After being taken to a national park where she starts to recuperate while killing nature violators, Poison Ivy is not back to full power. Renee tries to get through to her to no avail even when Poison Mary shows up. After Renee leaves, Poison Ivy embraces Poison Mary as she is brought back to full power. When planning to destroy Gotham Dam, Poison Ivy siphons the energy from Poison Mary who had been used as a carrier for a pheromone blocker. This caused Poison Ivy to weaken and she is defeated by Batwoman while Batwing prevents the dam's destruction. When Poison Ivy awakens on an airplane, Renee states to her that she cut a deal with Sophie for Poison Ivy's freedom that involves her being dropped off in Coryana.
 Kiki Roulette (portrayed by Judy Reyes) - A toymaker and former minion of Joker who made the joy buzzer that Joker wielded. At one point, she helped Joker kill Robin with a crowbar. While Mary and Alice track down Kiki who was under the alias of Kathleen Rogers in order to get the joy buzzer fixed, it is revealed that she is in cahoots with Marquis Jet and her former therapist was Harley Quinn. While Batwoman rescues Mary and Alice from Marquis' minions, Kiki escapes and meets up with Marquis while also revealing that the joy buzzer only has one shock in it due to being corroded inside. Alice later tries to force Kiki to make another buzzer for the former, but Marquis shoots Kiki dead.
 Jack Napier / Joker (portrayed by Nathan Dashwood) - The self-proclaimed "Clown Prince of Crime" and enemy of Batman who was mentioned a lot. He was responsible for the bus hijacking where he used a joybuzzer on Marquis Jet's head and ran Gabi Kane's car off the road as well as a vandalized portrait that contained the location of Coryana. Joker was said to have died in battle against Batman where the public believed that he was still incarcerated at Arkham Asylum. Joker was finally seen in a flashback when Marquis told Alice about his encounter with Joker.

See also
 List of Arrowverse actors

Notes

References

External links
 Full cast and crew of Batwoman at IMDb

characters
Batwoman
Batwoman
Batwoman
Batwoman
Batwoman